Elsa Grether (born 28 June 1980) is a French classical violinist, laureate of the International Pro Musicis 2009 Prize unanimously by the jury (with pianist Delphine Bardin), who made her recital debut at Carnegie Hall in New York and in Boston in 2012.

Training 
Born in Mulhouse, Grether began playing the violin at the age of five. She continued her training abroad at the Mozarteum University Salzburg with Ruggiero Ricci, then in the United States with Mauricio Fuks at the Indiana University Bloomington and Donald Weilerstein at the New England Conservatory of Music of Boston. She also benefited from the advice of Régis Pasquier in Paris.

Style and repertoire
As a soloist with orchestra, she has played numerous concertos (Bach, Vivaldi, Mozart, Haydn, Beethoven, Bruch, Brahms, Tchaikovsky, Shebalin, Dvorak, Prokofiev, Saint-Saëns, Ravel's Tzigane etc.)

She performs in recital in prestigious festivals and venues in France and abroad: , Festival de Menton Bozar and Le Flagey in Brussels, Salle Cortot in Paris, Musica Festival in Strasbourg, Forest Festival, Sully Festival, Festival Lille Clef de Soleil, Palazzetto Bru-Zane in Venice, Radio Suisse-Romande in Geneva, Festival Musiques en Eté in Geneva, Festival Cully Classique (Switzerland), Flâneries musicales de Reims, Festival de Saint-Lizier, Festival des Abbayes en Lorraine, Festival de Musique Sacrée de Perpignan, Festival Berlioz, Grandes Heures de Cluny, Chicago Myra Hess Concert Series, Mozarteum in Salzbourg, Radio Nationale d’Alger, Scène Nationale de Martinique etc.

She collaborates in particular with pianists David Lively, Ferenc Vizi, François Dumont, Marie Vermeulin, Johan Schmidt, Delphine Bardin, as well as with Jérémy Jouve (guitar), Régis Pasquier (violin) etc.

She is also fond of the solo violin repertoire, performing in very eclectic programmes.

Critics 
 devoted a program to her in "Toute la musique qu'ils aiment" (France 3) and she is regularly invited on France Musique, France Culture, Musiq’3, RTS Suisse et Accent4.

Her first three CDs, released by Fuga Libera, got unanimous reviews, especially in specialized magazines (Gramophone, 5 Diapasons, 4 étoiles Classica, Concertclassic Classiquenews , Musicologie.org, La Libre Belgique, Artamag, Wunderkammern, la Revue du Spectacle, etc.)

Discography 
 March 2013: Poème mystique (Ernest Bloch, Arvo Pärt), recorded with the pianist Ferenc Vizi, at Fuga Libera/Harmonia Mundi.
 November 2015: French Resonance (Gabriel Pierné, Louis Vierne and Gabriel Fauré) recorded with the pianist François Dumont, at Fuga Libera/Outhere.
 June 2017: Kaléidoscope, solo violin (Bach, Tôn-Thất Tiết, Ysaÿe, Khachaturian, Honegger, Albéniz), recorded at the Fontevraud Abbey at Fuga Libera/Outhere.
 April 2019 : Masques (Sergueï Prokofiev), recorded with the pianist David Lively, at Fuga Libera/Outhere.
 September 2022 : Complete Works for Violin and Piano (Ravel), recorded with the pianist David Lively, at Aparté.

References

External links 
 Official website
 Discography (Discogs)
 Teaser CD Kaléidoscope
 Asturias, Albeniz, from the Kaléidoscope CD
 Soundcloud from the French Resonance CD
 Elsa GRETHER, Eugène YSAYE, Sonata no.3, Ballade (YouTube)

21st-century French women classical violinists
1980 births
Living people
Musicians from Mulhouse
Mozarteum University Salzburg alumni
Indiana University Bloomington alumni
New England Conservatory alumni